Tim Mayotte was the defending champion, but lost in the third round to Todd Witsken.

Andre Agassi won the title by defeating Jim Grabb 6–1, 6–4 in the final.

Seeds
The first eight seeds received a bye to the second round.

Draw

Finals

Top half

Section 1

Section 2

Bottom half

Section 3

Section 4

References

External links
 Official results archive (ATP)
 Official results archive (ITF)

Sovran Bank Classic Singles